Frederick James Scullin Jr. (born November 5, 1939) is an American attorney and Senior United States district judge of the United States District Court for the Northern District of New York.

Education and career

Scullin was born in Syracuse, New York. He attended Niagara University (Bachelor of Science, 1961), and Syracuse University College of Law (Bachelor of Laws, 1964). After graduating from law school, Scullin served in the United States Army as an Infantry Commander in Vietnam. Scullin practiced law as a private attorney and in various prosecutors' offices from 1967 to 1982. In 1982 he was appointed United States Attorney for the Northern District of New York by President Ronald Reagan. He served in the position for ten years until 1992.

Judicial tenure

On September 12, 1991, Scullin was nominated to the United States District Court for the Northern District of New York by President George H. W. Bush. He was confirmed by the United States Senate on February 6, 1992, and received his commission on February 10, 1992. He served as Chief Judge of the District from 2000 until March 13, 2006, when he assumed senior status.

Scullin was also appointed by Chief Justice Rehnquist to the United States Foreign Intelligence Surveillance Court for a term of seven years running from 2004 until 2011.

Notable case

On July 26, 2014, Judge Scullin struck down the District of Columbia's ban on carrying handguns outside of a person's home, saying that the ban violated the Second Amendment. He wrote that "there is no longer any basis on which this court can conclude that the District of Columbia's total ban on the public carrying of ready-to-use handguns outside the home is constitutional under any level of scrutiny." In response to the ruling, the D.C. Metropolitan Police determined that non-residents bearing firearms in the district are subject to the handgun laws of their home jurisdiction; in effect, this makes the District much more permissive of firearms. On July 29, 2014, in response to a partially unopposed motion filed by the District of Columbia, Judge Scullin issued a 90-day stay of his initial order. The stay expired on November 28, 2014.

References

Sources

Official biography from the District Court

Living people
1939 births
Lawyers from Syracuse, New York
United States Army soldiers
United States Army personnel of the Vietnam War
Judges of the United States District Court for the Northern District of New York
Niagara University alumni
Syracuse University College of Law alumni
United States Attorneys for the Northern District of New York
United States district court judges appointed by George H. W. Bush
20th-century American judges
Judges of the United States Foreign Intelligence Surveillance Court
21st-century American judges